Moon Over Harlem is a 1939 American race film directed by Edgar G. Ulmer.

Plot summary 
A gangster, Dollar Bill Richards, seduces a wealthy widow, Minnie, to get his hands on her money.

Cast 
Bud Harris as Dollar Bill
Cora Green as Minnie
Izinetta Wilcox as Sue
Earl Gough as Bob
Zerita Stepteau as Jackie
Petrina Moore as Alice
Daphne Fray as Pat
Mercedes Gilbert as Jackie's mother
Frances Harrod as Maud
Alec Lovejoy as Fats
Walter Richardson as Brother Hornsby
Slim Thompson as Long-Boy
Freddie Robinson as Half-Pint
John Bunn as Wallstreet
Marieluise Bechet as Nina Mae Brown
Archie Cross as A Boy from Newark
William Woodward as A Boy from Newark
John Fortune as Jamaica
Audrey Talbird as Connie
Marie Young as Jean
Christopher Columbus and His Swing Crew as Themselves
Sidney Bechet as himself - Clarinetist

Soundtrack 
"My Hope Chest of Dreams" (1939) (Music and lyrics by Donald Heywood)
Zerita Steptean - "St. Louis Blues" (1914) (Music and lyrics by W.C. Handy)
Christopher Columbus and His Swing Crew and sung by Izinetta Wilcox and chorus - "Teach Me How to Sing Again" (1939) (Music and lyrics by Donald Heywood)
Christopher Columbus and His Swing Crew - "Save Some of Those Roses for Me" (published title) as "Save Me Some of Those Kisses" (1939) (Music and lyrics by Donald Heywood)
Mourners at the funeral - "One More River to Cross" (1939) (Music and lyrics by Donald Heywood)
"Moon Over Harlem" (1939) (Music and lyrics by Donald Heywood)
"Stand Together Children" (1939) (Music and lyrics by Donald Heywood)
"Lullaby" (1939) (Music and lyrics by Donald Heywood)

External links 

Moon Over Harlem (1939) at The Department of Afro American Research, Arts, and Culture's Archive (DAARAC)

1939 films
American crime films
American romantic musical films
1939 crime films
American black-and-white films
Race films
Films directed by Edgar G. Ulmer
1930s romantic musical films
1930s English-language films
1930s American films